The 1974 Tirreno–Adriatico was the 9th edition of the Tirreno–Adriatico cycle race and was held from 12 March to 16 March 1974. The race started in Santa Marinella and finished in San Benedetto del Tronto. The race was won by Roger De Vlaeminck of the Brooklyn team.

General classification

References

1974
1974 in Italian sport